

France
 Saint-Domingue – Louis de Courbon, comte de Blénac, Governor-General of Saint-Domingue (1714–1717)

Great Britain
 Massachusetts – 
Joseph Dudley, Governor of Massachusetts Bay Colony (1702–1715)
William Tailer, Acting Governor of Massachusetts Bay Colony (1715–1716)

Oman
 Mombasa – Nasr ibn Abdallah al-Mazru‘i, Wali of Mombasa (1698–1728)

Portugal
 Angola – João Manuel de Noronha, Governor of Angola (1713–1717)
 Macau – D.Francisco de Alarcao Sotto-Maior, Governor of Macau (1714–1718)

Netherlands
 Dutch East Indies – Christoffel van Swoll, Governor-General of the Dutch East Indies (1713–1718)
 Zeylan – Hendrik Bekker, Governor of Zeylan (1707–1716)

Colonial governors
Colonial governors
1715